Brian Ruiz may refer to:

 Braian Ruíz (born 1998), Argentine footballer
 Bryan Ruiz (born 1985), Costa Rican footballer